= Lingling Wei =

Chinese journalist and author

Lingling Wei is the chief China correspondent for The Wall Street Journal.

In 2020, she coauthored with Bob Davis the book Superpower Showdown: How the Battle Between Trump and Xi Threatens a New Cold War.
